A constitutional referendum was held in the Maldives on 15 March 1968. The main question was whether to convert the state from a constitutional monarchy under Sultan Muhammad Fareed Didi to a presidential republic. The referendum was the third on the subject; the first in 1952 had seen the state convert to a presidential system, whilst a second in 1953 reversed the decision and saw the monarchy restored in 1954.

The proposals were approved by over 80% of voters, and a republic was declared on 11 November that year. Prime Minister Ibrahim Nasir would become president.

Results

References

Maldives
1968 in the Maldives
Referendums in the Maldives
Constitutional referendums
Monarchy referendums
March 1968 events in Asia